Tina Sani is a Pakistani female singer famous for her classical and semi-classical Urdu Ghazals.

Early life
Tina Sani was born in Dhaka, at the time East Pakistan; the family moved to Kabul for a few years, where her father, Nasir Sahni, worked for an oil company, before moving to Karachi, where after graduating from the Karachi American School, she went on to study commercial art. She was trained in classical music by Ustad Nizamuddin Khan, son of Ustad Ramzan Khan of Delhi gharana and Ustad Chand Amrohvi. Tina also received special training from ghazal maestro Mehdi Hassan.

Career
Tina Sani began working for an advertising agency in 1977. She was involved in all the creative aspects of advertising business, including listening to and evaluating the music that is an integral part of advertising. Tina also taught at the Karachi American School in the art department.

Singing career
She entered the professional world of singing in 1980, when producer Ishrat Ansari introduced her on TV in a youth programme titled 'Tarang' hosted by Alamgir.

She was influenced by renowned ghazal singers from South Asia like Mehdi Hassan, Malika Pukhraj, Begum Akhtar, Mukhtar Begum and Farida Khanum but has created her own style of singing. She gained much acclaim in Pakistan and India by singing the poetry of Faiz Ahmed Faiz including poems like  and  composed by Arshad Mehmood. She renders poetry of contemporary poets with complete ease and is equally at home singing works of famous poets like Zauq, Ghalib, Mir Taqi Mir and Jalaluddin Rumi.

Her rendition of Iqbal's Shikwa Jawab-e-Shikwa has earned her great reviews and remains to be the lengthiest piece of poetry she has ever sung.

More recently Tina Sani sang Rumi's beginning verses of the Mathnavi for Coke Studio (Pakistan) to bring verses of the 13th century mystic poet's Persian verses in Urdu language.

Tina Sani was invited as a guest judge in the first Pakistan Idol TV show.

Tina Sani was part of Lahore music meet, 2016. She shared her music journey in a session named "Classical Music Appreciation". Sani also discussed the current situation and lack of classical music from Pakistani music industry. She praised role of television in supporting them to continue practising music.

She has sung many songs for the Pakistani TV and film industry, such as the OST for Hum TV's soap 'Choti Si Ghalat Fehmi' and Ho Mann Jahan's 'Khush Piya Wassen'. She has also sung the OST for PTV's 'Moorat', Hum TV's Bari Aapa and ARY Zindagi's 'Bahu Begum'.

Her top five favourite songs are

 بابل مورا – a song by K.L. Saigal
 کورا کاغذ تھا یہ من میرا – a song from film Aradhana by Kishore Kumar
  آپ جیسا کوئی میری زندگی میں آئے تو بات بن جائے – a song by Nazia Hasan from 1980 film Qurbani
 کھڑی نیم کے نیچے – a folk song by Pakistani folk singer Mai Bhaagi
 کوئی تو ہے جو نظامِ ہستی چلا رہا ہے وہی خدا ہے – a Hamd song by Nusrat Fateh Ali Khan, written by Muzaffar Warsi

Awards
 The Pride of Performance Award in 2004 – Government of Pakistan
 Performance Recognition Award (2011) by President of India during centennial celebrations of Faiz Ahmed Faiz
 Lifetime Achievement Award from Lux Style Awards in 2017

References

External links
 Beyondborders: Shubha Mudgal and Tina Sani
 Tina Sani interview on cineplot.com website
 Coke Studio recording on YouTube

Living people
Pakistani people of Bangladeshi descent
Pakistani ghazal singers
Recipients of the Pride of Performance
Karachi American School alumni
Women ghazal singers
People from Dhaka
Pakistani expatriates in Afghanistan
Year of birth missing (living people)
 20th-century Pakistani women singers